Treichville is a neighborhood in Abidjan, Ivory Coast. It is one of the 10 urban communes of the city. Treichville is one of four communes of Abidjan that are entirely south of Ébrié Lagoon, the others being Port-Bouët, Koumassi, and Marcory.

Treichville is known as one of the most lively neighborhoods in Abidjan, especially around the Crossroad France-Amérique. The streets in Treichville do not have names but are numbered from 1 to 47. The commune is served by a railway station belonging to the RAN. The railway offers a passenger service to Ouagadougou, in Burkina Faso, which takes around 30 hours.

The Autonomous Port of Abidjan is located in Treichville.

Treichville's name comes from Marcel Treich-Laplène (1860–1890), who was a French resident in Ivory Coast. Its current mayor, first elected at the municipal election in March 2001, is François Amichia, former minister of tourism.

In March and April 2011, Treichville was caught up in the 2010–2011 Ivorian crisis and many people there were killed.

Monuments and infrastructure 
 State swimming pool of Treichville
 Omnisport Palace of Treichville
 Sports Park
 Cultural Palace
 Abidjan Racecourse
 The Living Room (former Boulevard of Stars)

Twinships 
The city is twinned to:
  Kumasi in Ghana
  Lamentin in France (Soon)

Images

Notes

External links

 Cathedral of Treichville Early 20th century image of Cathedral of Treichville at USC
 Mosquée de Treichville Picture of the Treichville mosque, showing its location on a map of Abidjan

Communes of Abidjan